There are several uses of the word Bodine:

People
Bodine is the stage name of a young teen Dutch artist, known for "The Voice Kids of Holland" and contributing to tracks of Trance artists like Ashley Wallbridge. 
A. Aubrey Bodine (1906–1970), a photographer of Baltimore and the Chesapeake Bay
Barbara Bodine, an American diplomat
Elizabeth Bodine (1898–1986), U.S. humanitarian
Frank L. Bodine (1874–1930), U.S. architect
Francis L. Bodine (born 1936), U.S. politician
Joseph Lamb Bodine (1883–1950), U.S. federal justice
Leah Bodine Drake (1904–1964), U.S. poet
Robert N. Bodine (1837–1914), U.S. Representative
Russell Bodine (born 1992), U.S. American football player
Samuel L. Bodine (1900–1958), U.S. politician
Walt Bodine (1920–2013), a U.S. broadcast journalist in Kansas City
The Bodine brothers are NASCAR drivers:
Geoff Bodine (born 1949), also notable as a bobsled builder
 Barry Bodine (born 1977), son of Geoff, also a NASCAR driver
Brett Bodine (born 1959)
Todd Bodine (born 1964)

Groups
The Bodines were a British rock group from the mid- to late-1980s
Bodine (band) was a Dutch heavy metal band

Fictional characters
 Pig Bodine, a fictional seaman created by Thomas Pynchon
 Duane "Dust Devil" Bodine, a fictional character from the Top 10 comic book published by WildStorm, see List of Top 10 characters 
 Jethro Bodine and Pearl Bodine, fictional hillbillies on The Beverly Hillbillies

See also
 Bodine's Bridge, a bridge carrying NY211 in New York State, USA
 Bodines Casino, Carson City, Nevada, USA
 Bodine Farmhouse, Walden, Montgomery, Orange County, NY, USA
 Metlar–Bodine House, Piscataway, New Jersey, USA
 Brett Bodine Racing 
 Geoff Bodine Racing
 Bo-Dyn Bobsled Project